Colonel Ronald Ernest Stephen Yeldham  (18 August 1902 – 14 August 1983) was an Indian-born British Army officer and cricketer.

Career
He served in Africa and the Indian Ocean from 1928 to 1945. In June 1945, Yeldham was appointed Commander of the Order of the British Empire (CBE) as temporary Colonel commanding the British troops in Mauritius.

In 1949 Yeldham was a Principal in the Colonial Office, West African Department, and wrote a memorandum (16 March) on Soviet activity in Nigeria. There was MI5 surveillance of Harry Pollitt's contact with Mokwugo Okoye, a Zikist leader (Yeldham, memorandum in December of that year). During the Malayan Emergency, in 1952, he was instrumental in the use of sodium trichloroacetate as a defoliant.

Yeldham then held civil appointments in Kenya, from 1954.

Cricketer
Yeldham played six first-class cricket matches in British India between 1925 and 1927, including one for the MCC. He later played twice for Egypt against HM Martineau's XI.

References

1902 births
1983 deaths
Sherwood Foresters officers
Egyptian cricketers
Indian cricketers
Marylebone Cricket Club cricketers
Europeans cricketers
Northern Punjab cricketers
Graduates of the Royal Military College, Sandhurst
British Army personnel of World War II
Commanders of the Order of the British Empire
Civil servants in the Colonial Office
British people in colonial India
Military personnel of British India